Frank Bradford Morse (August 7, 1921 – December 18, 1994) was a member of the United States House of Representatives from Massachusetts. He had a notable career in the United States Congress and the United Nations. In Congress, he served in various capacities for nearly twenty years, the last twelve as Congressman from Lowell, Massachusetts. In 1972, he became Under-Secretary-General of the United Nations and in 1976, the Administrator of the United Nations Development Programme. He received a Franklin D. Roosevelt Four Freedoms Award for his career as an international public servant.

Biography
Morse was born in Lowell, Massachusetts on August 7, 1921 and graduated from Boston University in 1948 and from Boston University School of Law in 1949. He served in World War II in the Army from 1942-1946 and was discharged as a second lieutenant. After the war, he served as a private practice lawyer, business executive, law clerk to Chief Justice of the Supreme Judicial Court of Massachusetts, and professor at Boston University School of Law, 1949-1953. He was elected to the Lowell City Council in 1952 and served there until 1953 when he was employed as a staff member for United States Senate Armed Services Committee, a position he held until 1955. From 1955 until 1958 he served as an executive secretary and chief assistant to United States Senator Leverett Saltonstall, and later as a deputy administrator of Veterans Administration from 1958-1960.

After the death of Edith Nourse Rogers in September 1960, he was selected by the Republican Party to take her place on the ballot and was elected as a Republican to the Eighty-seventh Congress in November 1960. He was then re-elected to the five succeeding Congresses (January 3, 1961- May 1, 1972.  In 1966, along with three Republican Senators and four other Republican Representatives, Morse signed a telegram sent to Georgia Governor Carl E. Sanders regarding the Georgia legislature's refusal to seat the recently elected Julian Bond in their state House of Representatives. This refusal, said the telegram, was "a dangerous attack on representative government. None of us agree with Mr. Bond's views on the Vietnam War; in fact we strongly repudiate these views. But unless otherwise determined by a court of law, which the Georgia Legislature is not, he is entitled to express them."

He became Under Secretary General for Political and General Assembly Affairs at the United Nations from 1972-1976. He was then promoted to be the third Administrator of the United Nations Development Programme from 1976-1986.  From 1986-1991, he served as the seventh president of the Salzburg Global Seminar, a non-profit organization based in Salzburg, Austria whose mission is to challenge current and future leaders to develop creative ideas for solving global problems.  He died at his home in Naples, Florida on December 18, 1994, and was cremated and placed in Arlington National Cemetery in Arlington, Virginia.

References

 Retrieved on 2009-05-18

|-

1921 births
1994 deaths
20th-century American lawyers
20th-century American politicians
Administrators of the United Nations Development Programme
United States Army personnel of World War II
Boston University School of Law alumni
Burials at Arlington National Cemetery
Massachusetts city council members
Massachusetts lawyers
Politicians from Lowell, Massachusetts
Republican Party members of the United States House of Representatives from Massachusetts
United States Army officers
American officials of the United Nations
Recipients of the Four Freedoms Award
United States congressional aides
American expatriates in Austria